Opulaa is a genus of moths of the family Thyrididae.

Type species: Opula impletalis  Walker, 1869

Species
Some species of this genus are:
Opula chopardi (Viette, 1954)
Opula hebes   Whalley 1971 
Opula impletalis   Walker 1869 
Opula lineata Whalley, 1967
Opula monsterosa   Whalley 1971 
Opula perigrapha   Hampson 1914 
Opula scardialis   Rebel 1914 
Opula spilotata   Warren 1898

References

Encyclopedia of Life

Glossata genera
Thyrididae